Khúc is a Vietnamese surname.

Notable people with the surname Khúc
Khúc family, a session of leaders who challenged Tang rule over Vietnam.
Khúc Thừa Dụ, the head of the Khúc family
Khúc Hạo
Khúc Thừa Mỹ

Vietnamese-language surnames